Jonesburg is a city in Montgomery County, Missouri, United States. The population was 726 at the 2020 census.

History
Jonesburg was platted in 1858, and named in honor of James Jones, a pioneer citizen. A post office called Jonesburgh was established in 1868, and the name was changed to Jonesburg in 1893.

Geography
Jonesburg is located at  (38.855124, -91.309961).

Demographics

2010 census
As of the census of 2010, there were 768 people, 281 households, and 175 families living in the city. The racial makeup of the city was 94.3% White, 0.8% African American, 0.3% Native American, 0.1% Asian, 1.2% from other races, and 3.4% from two or more races. Hispanic or Latino of any race were 2.2% of the population.

There were 281 households, of which 31.7% had children under the age of 18 living with them, 43.8% were married couples living together, 12.1% had a female householder with no husband present, 6.4% had a male householder with no wife present, and 37.7% were non-families. 32.0% of all households were made up of individuals, and 17.1% had someone living alone who was 65 years of age or older. The average household size was 2.42 and the average family size was 3.02.

The median age in the city was 41.3 years. 24.1% of residents were under the age of 18; 6.5% were between the ages of 18 and 24; 22.8% were from 25 to 44; 21.3% were from 45 to 64; and 25.3% were 65 years of age or older. The gender makeup of the city was 45.1% male and 54.9% female.

2000 census
As of the census of 2000, there were 695 people, 269 households, and 161 families living in the city. The population density was 553.3 people per square mile (213.0/km2). There were 296 housing units at an average density of 235.7 per square mile (90.7/km2). The racial makeup of the city was 96.69% White, 1.44% African American, 0.14% Native American, and 1.73% from two or more races. Hispanic or Latino of any race were 0.58% of the population.

There were 269 households, out of which 27.9% had children under the age of 18 living with them, 42.0% were married couples living together, 11.5% had a female householder with no husband present, and 40.1% were non-families. 34.9% of all households were made up of individuals, and 21.2% had someone living alone who was 65 years of age or older. The average household size was 2.40 and the average family size was 3.03.

In the city the population was spread out, with 23.9% under the age of 18, 9.6% from 18 to 24, 26.3% from 25 to 44, 17.4% from 45 to 64, and 22.7% who were 65 years of age or older. The median age was 38 years. For every 100 females there were 85.3 males. For every 100 females age 18 and over, there were 84.3 males.

The median income for a household in the city was $26,875, and the median income for a family was $31,786. Males had a median income of $25,446 versus $20,000 for females. The per capita income for the city was $13,230. About 14.7% of families and 16.8% of the population were below the poverty line, including 18.9% of those under age 18 and 23.6% of those age 65 or over.

References

External links
 Historic maps of Jonesburg in the Sanborn Maps of Missouri Collection at the University of Missouri

Cities in Montgomery County, Missouri
Cities in Missouri